The Lithuanian litas (ISO currency code LTL, symbolized as Lt; plural litai (nominative) or litų (genitive) was the currency of Lithuania, until 1 January 2015, when it was replaced by the euro. It was divided into 100 centų (genitive case; singular centas, nominative plural centai). The litas was first introduced on 2 October 1922 after World War I, when Lithuania declared independence and was reintroduced on 25 June 1993, following a period of currency exchange from the Soviet ruble to the litas with the temporary talonas then in place. The name was modeled after the name of the country (similar to Latvia and its lats). From 1994 to 2002, the litas was pegged to the U.S. dollar at the rate of 4 to 1. The litas was pegged to the euro at the rate of 3.4528 to 1 since 2002. The euro was expected to replace the litas by 1 January 2007, but persistent high inflation and the economic crisis delayed the switch. On 1 January 2015 the litas was switched to the euro at the rate of 3.4528 to 1.

First litas, 1922–1941

History
The first litas was introduced on 2 October 1922, replacing the ostmark and ostrubel, both of which had been issued by the occupying German forces during World War I. The ostmark was known as the auksinas in Lithuania.

The litas was established at a value of 10 litų = 1 US dollar and was subdivided into 100-centų. In the face of worldwide economic depression, the litas appeared to be quite a strong and stable currency, reflecting the negligible influence of the depression on the Lithuanian economy. One litas was covered by 0.150462 grams of gold stored by the Bank of Lithuania in foreign countries. In March 1923, the circulation amounted to 39,412,984 litas, backed by 15,738,964 in actual gold and by 24,000,000 in high exchange securities. It was required that at least one third of the total circulation would be covered by gold and the rest by other assets. By 1938, 1 U.S. dollar was worth about 5.9 litai, rising to about 20 U.S. cents before its disappearance in 1941.

Memelgebiet
In March 1939 Nazi Germany demanded that Lithuania give up the Klaipėda Region (also known as the Memel Territory), which had been detached from Germany after World War I. The Lithuanian government complied, and on 23 March 1939 the area was annexed by Germany.
On the same day the reichsmark replaced the litas as the official currency of the region, with 1 litas being exchanged for 40 pfennig. Until 20 May 1939 inhabitants of the Memelgebiet could exchange litas for reichsmarks.

Soviet occupation
The litas was replaced by the Soviet ruble in April 1941 after Lithuania was annexed by the Soviet Union, with 1 litas equal to 0.9 ruble, although the actual value of the litas was about 3–5 rubles. Such an exchange rate provided great profit for Soviet military and party officials. Trying to protect the value of the currency, people started to massively buy, which, together with a downfall in production (following nationalization), caused material shortages. Withdrawals were then limited to 250 litų before the litas was completely abolished.

Coins

Coins were introduced in 1925 in denominations of 1 centas, 2 centai, 5 centai, 10, 20, 50-centų, and 1 litas, 2, 5-litai, with the litas coins in silver. 10 litų coins were introduced in 1936. All these coins were designed by the sculptor Juozas Zikaras (1881–1944). The litas coins displayed Jonas Basanavičius and Vytautas the Great, which was replaced by a portrait of President Antanas Smetona.

Banknotes

In 1922, the Bank of Lithuania issued notes in denominations of 1 centas, 2 centu, 5 centai, 10, 20, 50-centų, and 1 litas, 2 litu, 5 litai, 10, 50, 100 litų. In 1924, 500 and 1000 litų notes were added. Denominations below 5 litai were replaced by coins in 1925.

Second litas, 1993–2015
The litas became Lithuania's currency once more on 25 June 1993, when it replaced the temporary talonas currency at a rate of 1 litas to 100 talonas.

Banknotes

In 1993, banknotes (dated 1991) were issued in denominations of 1 litas, 2, 5 litai, 10, 20, 50, 100 litų. Due to poor designs, these were found to be easily copied and a second series of notes was swiftly introduced in denominations of 1 litas, 2, 5 litai, 10, 20, 50 litų, with only the 100 litų notes of the first series remaining in circulation. 200 litų notes were introduced in 1997, followed by 500 litų in 2000.

Coins

In 1993, coins were introduced (dated 1991) in denominations of 1 centas, 2, 5 centai, 10, 20, 50-centų, and 1 litas, 2, 5 litai. The 1 centas, 2, 5 centai pieces were minted in aluminium, the 10, 20, 50-centų in bronze and the litas coins were of cupro-nickel. In 1997, nickel-brass 10, 20, 50-centų coins were introduced, followed by cupro-nickel 1 litas, bimetallic 2 and 5 litai in 1998. All had the obverse designs showing the coat of arms in the center and the name of the state "Lietuva" in capital letters.

The first coins were minted in the United Kingdom and arrived in Lithuania on 31 October 1990. Later, all coins were minted in the state run "Lithuanian Mint", which started its operations in September 1992 and helped to cut the costs of introducing the litas.

History

Preparatory work
Officials started to prepare for the introduction of the litas even before independence was declared, it was thought to introduce the litas alongside the ruble even if Lithuania remained a part of the Soviet Union. In December 1989, artists were asked to submit sketches of possible coin and banknote designs. Also, a list of famous people was compiled in order to determine who should be featured for its currency.

The Bank of Lithuania was established on 1 March 1990. Ten days later Lithuania declared its independence from the Soviet Union. At first the Lithuanian government negotiated in vain with François Charles Oberthur, a printing company located in France to print the banknotes. In November 1990, the Bank of Lithuania decided to work with the United States Banknote Corporation (now American Banknote Corporation). In late autumn 1991, the first shipments of litas banknotes and coins arrived in Lithuania.

In November 1991, the Currency Issue Law was passed and the Litas Committee was created. It had the power to fix the date for the litas to come into circulation, the terms for the withdrawal from circulation of the ruble, the exchange rate of the litas and other conditions. Officials waited for a while for the economy to stabilise so as not to expose the young litas to inflation. About 80% of Lithuania's trade was with Russia and the government needed to find a way to smooth the transition away from the ruble zone. Also Lithuania needed to gather funds to form a stabilisation fund.

Gathering funds
At first, Lithuania did not have gold or any other securities to back up the litas. Lithuania needed to find about 200 million U.S. dollars to form the stabilisation fund. First, it sought to recover its pre-war gold reserves (about 10 tonnes) from France, the United Kingdom, Switzerland, etc. In the interwar period Lithuania stored its gold reserves in foreign banks. After the occupation in 1940 those reserves were deemed "nobody's": there was no Lithuania and most Western countries condemned the occupation as illegal and did not recognise the Soviet Union as a successor. The Bank of England, for example, sold the reserves to the Soviets in 1967. However, in January 1992 it announced that this action was a "betrayal of the people of the Baltic states" and that it would return the originally deposited amount of gold, now worth about 90 million pounds sterling, to the three Baltic states. Lithuania received 18.5 million pounds or 95,000 ounces of gold and remained a customer of the bank. Similarly, in March 1992 Lithuania reclaimed gold from the Bank of France and later from the Bank of Sweden.

In October 1992, the International Monetary Fund (Lithuania joined this organisation on 29 April 1992) granted the first loan of 23.05 million U.S. dollars to create the stabilisation fund. However, it is estimated that at the time of the introduction of the new currency, Lithuania gathered only $120 million for the stabilisation fund. For a brief while it was kept a secret so as not to further damage the reputation and trust in the litas.

Delayed introduction of the litas
Lietuvos Rytas journalists investigated the production of the litas and found that for a while it was purposely held back. For example, 6 million litas designated to pay for printing the banknotes stayed in a zero interest bearing account for a year in a bank in Sweden. By 1992, the litas was ready for introduction, but the banknotes were of extremely low quality, they could easily be counterfeited with a simple colour printer; especially the 10, 20, and 50 litų banknotes.

Newly elected President Algirdas Brazauskas dismissed the Chair of the Bank of Lithuania, Vilius Baldišis, for incompetence just two months before the introduction of the litas. Baldišis was later charged for negligence that cost Lithuania $3,000,000. Some claim that the Russian secret services were behind the affair. Baldišis' explanation was that he was trying to cut the costs of printing the banknotes and thus did not order better security features. Also, "U.S. Banknote Corporation" was accused of violation of the contract terms.

But when the new issue of litas banknotes was redesigned, reprinted, and introduced in June 1993, it was found that the quality of the money was still too low and the banknotes would have to be redesigned further in the future. All these scandals and the small backup of gold reserve (about $120 million instead of $200 million) damaged the reputation of the litas. The newly appointed chair, Romualdas Visokavičius, moved things quickly and won the trust of the public. However, in October he was asked to resign mostly because of his involvement with a private bank "Litimpex".

Introduction of the litas

On 25 June 1993, the litas was finally introduced at the rate of 1 litas to 100 talonas. 1 U.S. dollar was worth 4.5 litai and decreased to about 4.2 a couple of weeks later. Even the introduction of the litas was followed by a scandal. The government allowed the changing of unlimited amounts of talonas to the litas without having to show the source of the talonas. This allowed criminal groups to legalize their funds.

In July, circulation of the talonas was stopped and on 1 August 1993, the litas became the only legal tender. Following the reintroduction of the litas, there was an effort to weed out U.S. dollars from the market. The talonas was never really trusted by the people and the ruble was very unstable. Thus, people started using U.S. dollars as a stable currency. Another alternative was the German mark, but it was not available in larger quantities. A lot of shops printed prices in several different currencies, including dollars, and the economy was very "dollarised" as it was legal to make trades in foreign currencies.

Due to poor banknote quality (both talonas and early litas) it was easy to counterfeit them. Most shops were forced to acquire ultraviolet lamps to check for forgeries. One group, for example, printed 500 talonas banknotes in Turkey. It is estimated that their notes totaled 140,000 litas.

From 1 April 1994 to 1 February 2002, the litas was pegged to the U.S. dollar at the rate of 4 to 1 (the litas was stable around 3.9 for half a year before the rate was fixed). The main reasons for this fixation was little trust in the emerging monetary system, fear of high fluctuations in currency exchange rates, desire to attract foreign investors, and International Monetary Fund recommendations. The peg was renewable every year. For a while a peg was considered to a basket of currencies: the European Currency Unit. At around this time Lithuania also established a currency board.

The litas and the euro
Alter successful round of negotiations in 1998 with the European Commission, the idea of aligning with the future currency of European Union. By 1999, the Bank of Lithuania proposed currency board with both US dollar and the euro.

The pegging of the litas and the euro was proposed to be implemented by the second half of 2001.

On 2 February 2002 the litas was pegged to the euro at a rate of 3.4528 to 1 (1 LTL = 0.28962 EUR) (it was the rate that the litas and the euro had by the time); this rate was not expected to change – and indeed did not – until the litas was completely replaced by the euro on 1 January 2015. After the peg, Lithuania became a member of the Eurozone de facto. The litas became part of the ERM II on 28 June 2004. the EU's exchange rate mechanism. The design of Lithuanian euro coins had already been prepared.

Lithuania postponed its euro day several times, since the country did not meet the convergence criteria. High inflationwhich reached 11% in October 2008, well above the then acceptable limit of 4.2%contributed to Lithuania's failure to meet the criteria. In 2011, polls showed narrow opposition to the currency. On 23 July 2014, the Council of the European Union adopted a decision allowing Lithuania to adopt the euro as its currency on 1 January 2015. Litas and euro were both legal tender in Lithuania until 16 January 2015.

See also

 Lithuanian euro coins
 Lithuanian grammar: Noun modification by numeral – usage of forms litas, litai, litų
 Economy of Lithuania

References

Sources

Further reading
 Documentaries directed by Rimtautas Šilinis "Iš lito istorijos: Banknotai" (From History of the Litas: Banknotes (2004)) and "Iš lito istorijos: Monetos" (From History of the Litas: Coins (2002))
 Bronė Vainauskienė, "Skandalingoji lito istorija" (Scandalous History of Litas (2003)) – collection of articles by Lietuvos Rytas journalist who spend 6 years investigating the history of the litas in the early years of independence.

External links

 Bank of Lithuania official website
 Lithuanian Coin Catalog
 Historical banknotes of Lithuania 

1922 establishments in Lithuania
1993 establishments in Lithuania
2015 disestablishments in Lithuania
Currencies of Lithuania
Currencies replaced by the euro
Fixed exchange rate
Modern obsolete currencies